Alan Galbraith (18801964) was a member of the Wisconsin State Assembly.

Biography
Galbraith was born on May 16, 1880 in Adams County, Wisconsin. He died in 1964.

Career
Galbraith was elected to the Assembly in 1916. Other positions he held include Register of Deeds of Adams County and justice of the peace in Friendship, Wisconsin. He was a Republican.

References

External links

People from Friendship, Wisconsin
Republican Party members of the Wisconsin State Assembly
American justices of the peace
1880 births
1964 deaths
Burials in Wisconsin
20th-century American judges
20th-century American politicians